TWOO or Twoo may refer to:

 The Wizard of Oz (disambiguation)
 Twoo.com, a matchmaking service whose parent company was bought by Meetic Group